District 5 of the Texas Senate is a senatorial district that serves Brazos, Freestone, Grimes, Leon, Limestone, Madison, Milam, Robertson, Walker and Williamson counties in the U.S. state of Texas. The current Senator from District 5 is Charles Schwertner.

Current Election

2018

Election history
Election history of District 5 from 1992.

2014

2012

2006

Previous elections

2002

1998

1997

1994

1992

District officeholders

References

05
Brazos County, Texas
Freestone County, Texas
Grimes County, Texas
Leon County, Texas
Limestone County, Texas
Madison County, Texas
Milam County, Texas
Robertson County, Texas
Walker County, Texas
Williamson County, Texas